Elias Kifle (Amharic: ኤልያስ ክፍሌ) is the publisher and editor-in-chief of the Washington D.C.-based Ethiopian Review, an English/Amharic language Ethiopian news and opinion journal that was launched in January 1991.

Family 
Elias Kifle's paternal grandfather was Lij Seifu Mikael and his maternal grandfather was Ato Zeleke Girref. Both of them were hereditary members of the Shewan Amhara aristocracy.
The famous Ethiopian scholar, author and poet Dr Kebede Mikael was Lij Seifu Mikael's nephew and was regarded as the uncle of Lij Seifu's grandchildren.
Elias' father, the eldest son of Lij Seifu is Ato Kifle Seifu, a retired businessman who founded and managed successful farming, mining and construction businesses with offices in Addis Ababa, Ethiopia and Rome, Italy. 
His businesses would later be confiscated and nationalized by the communist derg regime that abolished the Ethiopian monarchy and spent years in the communist prison as the result of the derg's effort in diminishing the influence and prestige of the Western educated elite and the members of Ethiopian nobility who are considered to be the oldest imperial families in the world. The elderly Kifle now resides in the suburbs of Atlanta with his wife of 60 years.

Libel 
In December 2010 Mohammed Hussein Ali Al Amoudi initiated a claim in the English High Court against Elias Kifle claiming damages for libel. In July 2011 Kifle was ordered to pay £175,000 in damages for publishing that Al Amoudi had hunted his daughter down so she could be stoned to death. Kifle's response to the verdict was, "Here is my formal statement: Screw yourself" and went on to describe Al Amoudi as a "scumbag bloodsucker" who was "funding al-Qaeda".

In 2012, Kifle was charged in absentia of treason and sentenced to life in prison.

References

External links
Ethiopian Review
Interview with Ethiopian Television Network (ETN)
On trial for treason (Amnesty International)
Attack on the Press (CPJ report 2006)
Attack on the Press (CPJ report 2007)
Arrests, closings, censorship found by CPJ delegationEthiopian political divide ensnares the press 
Ethiopian editor sentenced to prison; another freed on bail (CPJ) 
Critical Web sites inaccessible in Ethiopia (CPJ) 
Ethiopian blog blockage sparks free speech debate (Global Voices)
The limits of free speech (EthioZagol)
Court sentenced Ethiopian opposition leaders to life in prison (Ethiopian Review)
Ethiopia and Human and Democratic Rights (Washington Post)
Elias Kifle on ETN's weekly TV show 'BeGimbar'
Elias Kifle and Andargachew Tsige guilty, Ethiopian court rules - Ethiopian Review article

Year of birth missing (living people)
Living people
Ethiopian activists
Ethiopian journalists